Elias Christian Thorvald Krak (12 June 1830 - 6 November 1908) was a Danish road engineer who headed the Department of Physical Planning (stadskonduktør) for 40 years in the City of Copenhagen and published the first City directory for Copenhagen.

Early life
Krak was born in Copenhagen to navigator Hans Andersen Krak (1789–1844) and Karen Sophie Lind (1800–77). His last name comes from his ancestors farm Krakkegård at the end of Røstadvej between Rø and Gudhjem on the island of Bornholm. Thorvald Krak used the spelling "Krack" until 1890 as a result of an error in the church records. He went to school in Maribo and later received a military education in Copenhagen where he became a lieutenant in the engineering troops in 1850 and a senior lieutenant in 1853.

Work for Copenhagen Municipality
In 1858, just 28 years old, he was appointed to stadskonduktør in Copenhagen and resigned from the army with status of captain. In 1859 he instigated systematic address numbering and in 1860–66 he surveyed all taxable properties in the city.

Krak resigned from his position as stadskonduktør in Copenhagen in 1898.

Krak's City Directory
In 1862, Krak was awarded a license to publish a city directory for the Greater Copenhagen area.  The work had been instigated by Hans Holck in 1770 but had only been sparsely updated for decades.  He completely reorganized and modernized the publication with inspiration from foreign capitals before publishing his first city directory in 1863. In 1902 he passed the publication of Kraks Vejviser (Krak's Road Directory) on to his son Ove Krak, who was a physician.

Personal life
Krak married Charlotte Henriette an. der Recke (27 November 1828 - 30 May1897) on 16 November 1858 in the Garrison Church in Copenhagen. She was the daughter of senior lieutenant and later Road Inspector Gengeal on Funen Peter Blankenborg Prydz van der Recke (1793–1847) and his wife Caroline Cecilie Petersen (1795–1868).

Krak is buried in the Garrison Cemetery in Copenhagen.

See also
 Krak House

References

External links
 House numbering

Danish engineers
People from Copenhagen
1830 births
1908 deaths
Burials at the Garrison Cemetery, Copenhagen